The 1972–73 season was Chelsea Football Club's fifty-ninth competitive season.

Table

References

External links
 1972–73 season at stamford-bridge.com

1972–73
English football clubs 1972–73 season